Dhamra (or Dhamara) is a small community on the banks of the Dhamra River in the Bhadrak district of Odisha state, India.  They were Shoodars before independence, as it's in history. Others believe they're descendants of Clan Loot. It developed as a port around the 15th century AD. The port was used for the coastal trade between northern Odisha and Kolkata to the northeast, and continued to be used to a small extent after independence in 1947. During April, 1998, an agreement was signed to develop the Port of Dhamara, about seven kilometers away on the coast of the Bay of Bengal, as a deep water port.

Legend
The temple of the Goddess Maa Dhamrai is located in the town. Some say that the goddess was brought from Sri Lanka by a local merchant who frequently traded with that island. Others say that she came from a place named Satabhaya. She was thrown into the sea by her sisters who were angered by her pure vegetarianism, and was found floating by some fishermen who brought her to Dhamra. After an earlier temple had been destroyed, the present temple was built over a ten-year period, opening around 1990.

References

Cities and towns in Bhadrak district